The Sângeorgiu de Pădure gas field natural gas field is located near Sângeorgiu de Pădure in Mureș County, Romania. It was discovered in 1920 and developed by Romgaz. It began production in 1925 and produces natural gas and condensates. The total proven reserves of the Sângeorgiu de Pădure gas field are around 871 billion cubic feet (25 km³), and production is slated to be around 55 million cubic feet/day (1.55×106m³) in 2010.

References

Natural gas fields in Romania